was a town located in Higashitsugaru District in northern Aomori Prefecture, Japan.

Kanita Town was located on the east coast of Tsugaru Peninsula bordering on Mutsu Bay. The area was part of Hirosaki Domain during the Edo period. After the Meiji Restoration, Kanita Village was created on April 1, 1889. It was elevated to town status on October 5, 1940.

On March 28, 2005, Kanita, along with the neighboring villages of Tairadate and Minmaya (all from Higashitsugaru District), was merged to create the town of Sotogahama, and thus no longer exists as an independent municipality.

At the time of its merger, Kanita had an estimated population of 3,745 and a population density of 32.17 persons per km2. The total area was 116.39 km2.

The town's economy was dominated by commercial fishing. Kanita was served by National Route 280, and by three stations on the Tsugaru Line of JR East.

Climate

References

Dissolved municipalities of Aomori Prefecture
Sotogahama, Aomori